Laura Whitmore (born 4 May 1985) is an Irish media personality and model based in London. She was a video jockey for MTV in 2008, and has since presented  television shows, such as This Morning (2014), Survival of the Fittest (2018) and Love Island (2020–2022). In 2020, Whitmore became a team captain on the comedy panel show Celebrity Juice.

Early life
Whitmore was born in Dublin on 4 May 1985. She has two half-brothers. She grew up in Bray, County Wicklow, where she attended Loreto Secondary School, before studying journalism at Dublin City University.

Career

Television
In April 2008, MTV Networks Europe launched a campaign Pick Me MTV where Whitmore competed against other contestants to become the face of MTV News in MTV Europe. Between 2008 and 2015, she hosted news bulletins for MTV in Ireland, the UK and pan-European MTV channels. She was regularly seen on MTV News hosting special events in Ireland and elsewhere in Europe.

For five series from 2011, Whitmore hosted I'm a Celebrity...Get Me Out of Here! NOW! on ITV2 airing immediately after I'm a Celebrity...Get Me Out of Here! . Whitmore announced on 14 April 2016 that she was leaving the show.

In the summer of 2012, she appeared on the RTÉ television talk show, Saturday Night with Miriam, after carrying the 2012 Summer Olympics torch.

A pilot episode of songwriting-based talent show The Hit aired in September 2012 on RTÉ Two, hosted by Whitmore. On 15 March 2013, RTÉ announced that the show had been ordered for a full series which was broadcast in the summer, but Whitmore would not host due to conflicting schedule in London. Aidan Power and Nicky Byrne presented the full series.

In April 2014, she co-hosted the 11th Irish Film & Television Awards with Simon Delaney.

In 2014, she joined the BBC Eurovision team as a commentator for the Eurovision Song Contest 2014 semi-finals in Copenhagen, Denmark alongside Scott Mills on BBC Three. She replaced Ana Matronic in the role, but did not return in 2015. In 2014, she was an occasional presenter of "The Hub" section on ITV's This Morning.

On 24 October 2014, she appeared in Channel 4's The Feeling Nuts Comedy Night to raise awareness of testicular cancer.

In February 2015, Whitmore left MTV News after seven years on the channel, but continued to present irregular segments and specials. Her last bulletin with the station was recorded on 26 February 2015.

On 10 August 2016, Whitmore took part in the fourteenth series of Strictly Come Dancing, beginning September 2016. She was partnered with Italian dancer Giovanni Pernice and was the sixth contestant to be voted out, on 5 November 2016, following a dance off with eventual series champions Ore Oduba and Joanne Clifton.

In 2018, she presented Survival of the Fittest, a reality series for ITV2, alongside comedian Brennan Reece.

On 20 December 2019, it was announced that Whitmore would host the sixth series of ITV2's Love Island in 2020 after Caroline Flack was arrested for assaulting her partner Lewis Burton. Following Flack's death while that was airing, Whitmore returned for the seventh series in June 2021.

On 23 August 2022, it was announced that Whitmore will step down from hosting Love Island. One of the reasons for stepping down was Whitmore's new projects that were conflicting with her commitment to Love Island.

Other work
In 2003, Whitmore was a contestant in a modelling talent search on RTÉ One's The Late Late Show, reaching the final 15 of the competition.

In August 2009, she launched a self-branded clothing range available at A Wear.

In 2011, she appeared on the September cover of FHM magazine.

Whitmore is a spokeswoman for the Because I Am a Girl charity clothing campaign.

She collaborated with Daisy London on a jewellery collection in October 2015. The collection was inspired by music and features the recurring shape of the plectrum throughout.

In October 2014, she launched Misstache for Movember, a campaign for women to support and raise awareness of the men's health charity.

She appeared on FHM 100 Sexiest 2015 list at number 37.

She features in the music video for "Skip to the Good Bit", a song by Rizzle Kicks and the music video for "Mark My Words" by The Coronas. In 2017, she played Cleo Morey alongside Shane Richie, Bill Ward and Stephen Billington in the stage adaptation of the Peter James book Not Dead Enough.

She hosted a weekly Sunday morning radio show on BBC Radio 5 Live between 2018 and 2022.

In September 2020, she was announced by Nintendo UK as a brand ambassador for the Nintendo Switch game Ring Fit Adventure and began appearing in a TV advertisement for the game.

On 4 March 2021, Whitmore's first book titled No One Can Change Your Life Except For You was released. In August 2022, it was announced that Whitmore would be joining the cast of 2:22 A Ghost Story on West End.

Personal life
As of 2018, Whitmore lived in the Camden area of London. She married Scottish comedian Iain Stirling in a private humanist ceremony in 2020 at Dublin City Hall. Whitmore gave birth to their daughter, Stevie Ré, in late March 2021.

Filmography

Guest appearances

Sunday Brunch (2012, 2015)
The Xtra Factor (2012)
Unzipped (2012)
Saturday Night with Miriam (2012)
Celebrity Juice (2012, 2014)
Britain's Got More Talent (2012, 2013, 2016, 2018)
Never Mind the Buzzcocks (2013)
Sweat the Small Stuff (2013)
Fake Reaction (2013, 2014)
Sunday Side Up (2013)
A League of Their Own (2014)
Virtually Famous (2015)
Celebrity Squares (2015)
Alan Carr's New Year Spectacular (2016)
Who Do You Think You Are? (2018)
The Crystal Maze (2020)
The Dumping Ground (2021)
Would I Lie to You? (2021)
Paul Sinha's TV Showdown (2021)
Richard Osman's House of Games (2021, 2022)The Great Celebrity Bake Off for SU2C (2022)
''Saturday Kitchen (2022)

References

External links

 
 

1985 births
Alumni of Dublin City University
Alumni of Griffith College
BBC Radio 5 Live presenters
Irish expatriates in the United Kingdom
Living people
People from Bray, County Wicklow
RTÉ television presenters
Television presenters from the Republic of Ireland